Lýdia Jakubisová (born 14 October 1981) is a Slovak handball player for Thüringer HC and the Slovak national team.

References

1981 births
Living people
Slovak female handball players
Slovak expatriate sportspeople in Germany
Sportspeople from Bojnice